Giovanni Prezioso born in 1957 in Boston to Dr. and Mrs. Fausto Maria Prezioso of Towson, Md, became General Counsel of the US Securities and Exchange Commission in April 2002.

He served in that post under three different chairmen, Harvey Pitt, William Donaldson, and Christopher Cox. During his tenure the SEC started over 2,000 actions and 100 rules changes. It also successfully implemented the Sarbanes-Oxley Act of 2002. He also reduced the back log of cases awaiting SEC resolution

In early 2006, Prezioso stepped down from the post and rejoined his prior law firm, Cleary Gottlieb Steen & Hamilton LLP, as a partner resident in the firm's Washington, DC office.

Prezioso's bar and other professional activities have included service as Chairman of the American Bar Association’s Subcommittee on Municipal and Governmental Obligations, as a member of the New York Stock Exchange Rule 431 Committee, and as a member of the Global Documentation Steering Committee sponsored by the Federal Reserve Bank of New York.   He is currently a member of the Board of Advisors of the SEC Historical Society.

Prezioso is a graduate of Harvard Law School (J.D., magna cum laude, 1982) and Harvard College (A.B., history and literature, magna cum laude, 1979).

Prezioso is a member of the Bar of the District of Columbia.

Prezioso is an Advisory Editor of the University of Bologna Law Review, a general student-edited law journal published by the Department of Legal Studies of the University of Bologna.

In 1987 he married Elizabeth Holladay Mathews, a television producer, at Christ Episcopal Church in Greenwich, Connecticut.

References

Living people
American lawyers
Harvard Law School alumni
1957 births
People associated with Cleary Gottlieb Steen & Hamilton
Harvard College alumni